, formal rank designations:  was the highest title in the pre-war Imperial Japanese military.

The title originated from the Chinese title yuanshuai (元帥).

The term gensui, which was used for both the Imperial Japanese Army and the Imperial Japanese Navy, was at first a rank held by Saigō Takamori as the Commander of the Armies (陸軍元帥 Rikugun-gensui) in 1872. However, in May 1873 Saigō was "demoted" to general, with gensui thereafter no longer a rank as such, but a largely honorific title awarded for extremely meritorious service to the Emperor - thus similar in concept to the French title of Marshal of France. Equivalent to a five-star rank (OF-10), it is similar to Field Marshal in the British Army and General of the Army in the United States Army.

While gensui would retain their actual ranks of general or admiral, they were entitled to wear an additional enamelled breast badge, depicting paulownia leaves between crossed army colors and a naval ensign under the Imperial Seal of Japan. They were also entitled to wear a special samurai sword (katana) of a modern design on ceremonial occasions.

In the Meiji period, the title was awarded to five generals and three admirals. In the Taishō period it was awarded to six generals and six admirals, and in the Shōwa period it was awarded to six generals and four admirals. The higher title of dai-gensui was comparable to the title of generalissimo and was held only by the Emperor himself.

List of Rikugun-gensui
Note that several were promoted the same year they died; these were posthumous promotions.

The title was also bestowed on King George V of the United Kingdom on October 29, 1918.

See also
Gensui (Imperial Japanese Navy)
Imperial Japanese Army
元帥：Pronounced as yuanshuai in Chinese, wonsu in Korean. 
大元帥：A title higher than gensui, pronounced as dai-gensui in Japanese, da yuanshuai in Chinese, taewonsu in Korean. 
List of field marshals

References

Military ranks of Japan